The Sayings of the Seers (or Sayings of Hozai, in the Masoretic Text) is a lost text referred to in . The passage reads: "His prayer also, and how God was intreated of him, and all his sin, and his trespass, and the places wherein he built high places, and set up groves and graven images, before he was humbled: behold, they are written among the sayings of the seers."

The Sayings of the Seers could be a source text, or else an indication to the reader of matter for "further reading".

See also 
 Table of books of Judeo-Christian Scripture
 Lost work
 Non-canonical books referenced in the Bible

Lost Jewish texts
Books of Chronicles